Dylan Cramer (born January 21, 1958 in North Vancouver, British Columbia), is a Canadian alto saxophonist, jazz musician and author.

Career
Cramer took up the saxophone at age 13, after the sudden death of his father. Four years later in 1977, Cramer heard a recording of alto sax legend Sonny Criss and was so taken with Sonny's playing that he travelled from Canada to Los Angeles to study with him. After developing a close relationship with Criss that lasted only eight months, Sonny Criss committed suicide. After briefly attending the Dick Grove School of Music in Los Angeles (1977–79), Cramer was recommended by Grove to study privately with Phil Sobel, one of L.A.’s finest studio musicians.  Cramer worked with Sobel from 1978 until Sobel's death in 2008.

In 1997, 20 years after Sonny's death, Cramer decided to do an album in his honour. For that recording, "Remembering Sonny Criss," he hired jazz legend and friend of Sonny, Leroy Vinnegar, on bass. In 2011, Nagel Heyer Records from Hamburg released the tribute worldwide. In 1998, Cramer recorded a classic jazz album, "All Night Long," which was received with critical acclaim worldwide and was a top seller on Amazon.com for many months. In 2003, Cramer recorded his third album, "Bumpin' On Sunset," which continued Cramer's masterful interpretations of movie themes, Latin tunes, and bluesy ballads. 2009 marked the release of Cramer's fourth album, "Alto," released on his own record label, Casa Records. In 2017, Cramer released his fifth album, "Blue Prelude," with pianist Ron Johnston, on Casa Records.  The album features two songs from George Michael, one from Michael McDonald and another from Stevie Wonder, along with the classic Amy Winehouse hit, "Back To Black.". In 2019, Cramer published his first book, "Alto Saxophone Mastery."  Three years later in 2022, Cramer published his second book, "Chasing My Father."

Discography 
 All Night Long (Nagel-Heyer, 2001)
 Bumpin' On Sunset (Nagel-Heyer, 2003)
 Alto (Casa, 2009)  
 Remembering Sonny Criss (Nagel-Heyer, 2011)
 Blue Prelude (Casa, 2017)
   Alto Saxophone Mastery (2019)
   Chasing My Father (2022)

References

External links
Dylan Cramer Official Website

1958 births
Canadian jazz saxophonists
Male saxophonists
Living people
Musicians from Vancouver
21st-century saxophonists
21st-century Canadian male musicians
Canadian male jazz musicians
Nagel-Heyer Records artists